Goniodiscus may refer to:
 Goniodiscus (plant), a genus of plants in the family Celastraceae
 Goniodiscus (mollusc), an extinct genus of molluscs in the order Ceratitida, family unknown
 Goniodiscus, a genus of echinoderms in the family Oreasteridae, synonym of Culcita
 Goniodiscus, an extinct genus of trilobites in the family Calodiscidae, synonym of Calodiscus